Engelkes (North German and Dutch: patronymic from Engelke) is a German language habitational surname for someone from Anglia. Notable people with the name include:
 Ed Engelkes (born 1964), Dutch football manager
 Heiko Engelkes (1933–2008), German journalist

See also 
 Engl (surname)
 Engl (disambiguation)
 Engel (surname) 
 Engels (surname)
 Engelman 
 Engelmann
 Engelke

References 

German-language surnames
Ethnonymic surnames
German toponymic surnames
Dutch-language surnames
Patronymic surnames
Low German surnames